Walter Krupinski (11 November 1920 – 7 October 2000) was a German Luftwaffe fighter ace in World War II and a senior West German Air Force officer during the Cold War. He was one of the highest-scoring pilots in the war, credited with 197 victories in 1,100 sorties. He was called by his fellow pilots  Graf Punski  (Count Punski) due to his Prussian origins. Krupinski was one of the first to fly the Messerschmitt Me 262 jet fighter in combat as a member of Jagdverband 44 led by Adolf Galland.

List of aerial victories claimed
According to US historian David T. Zabecki, Krupinski was credited with 197 aerial victories. Spick also lists Krupinski with 197 aerial victories, claimed in approximately 1,100 combat missions. This figure includes 177 aerial victories claimed over the Eastern Front and 20 in the western theatre of operations and includes one heavy bomber. Mathews and Foreman, authors of Luftwaffe Aces — Biographies and Victory Claims, researched the German Federal Archives and found records for 197 aerial victory claims, plus five further unconfirmed claims. This figure of confirmed claims includes 178 aerial victories on the Eastern Front and 19 on the Western Front, including one four-engined bomber and two victories with the Me 262 jet fighter.

Victory claims were logged to a map-reference (PQ = Planquadrat), for example "PQ 28472". These sectors were then subdivided into 36 smaller units to give a location area 3 × 4 km in size.

Notes

References

Citations

Bibliography

 
 
 
 
 
 
 
 
 
 
 
 

Aerial victories of Krupinski, Walter
Krupinski, Walter
Aviation in World War II